Monochroma is a cinematic puzzle-platform video game, and the first title by Istanbul-based developer Nowhere Studios. It was released on Xbox One on June 24, 2016.

Plot
Set in an alternate universe, Monochroma tells the story of two little boys, brothers, who fly a kite. While the older brother watches over the younger, the younger brother injures himself. This means the older brother must carry the younger brother. The brothers soon witness something truly awful. Alone in the storm, they must survive six hours of devilishly clever puzzles in order to save their world from tyranny.

Development
The game was first announced at GDC 2013. To acquire sufficient funding for the game, the project was first revealed on crowdfunding website Kickstarter to reach a goal of US$80,000, and successfully exceeded the goal, acquiring $84,644. The game was approved on Steam Greenlight on September 19, 2013 and released on May 28, 2014.

Reception 

Monochroma received "mixed or average" reviews, according to review aggregator Metacritic.

Tom McShea of GameSpot gave the game 4/10, stating that "most of the later puzzles demanding precision that's just not possible" and "there are too many problems heaping frustration upon you". Hardcore Gamer gave it a 3.5/5, saying: "The colorless world may have drained the life from everything in it, but its endless challenges can’t leech the determination of a boy intent on keeping his brother safe." Niche Gamer believed that "platforming fans will feel disappointed, and puzzlers may not feel the game is quite satisfying enough. The overall experience, however, is good enough, just."

References

External links
 

2014 video games
Art games
Indie video games
Kickstarter-funded video games
Crowdfunded video games
Microsoft games
MacOS games
Platform games
Puzzle video games
Side-scrolling video games
Single-player video games
Steam Greenlight games
Video games developed in Turkey
Windows games
Linux games
Video games with silhouette graphics